Aktaş is a village in the Siirt District of Siirt Province in Turkey. The village had a population of 602 in 2021.

The hamlets of Arpalı, Bakır, Düzlüce and Konaklı are attached to the village.

References 

Villages in Siirt District
Kurdish settlements in Siirt Province